Boris Mikhaylovich Shaposhnikov ( – 26 March 1945) was a Soviet military commander, Chief of the General Staff of the Soviet Armed Forces, and Marshal of the Soviet Union.

Biography

Shaposhnikov, born at Zlatoust, near Chelyabinsk in the Urals, had Orenburg Cossack origins. He joined the army of the Russian Empire in 1901 as an officer cadet, and graduated from the  Nicholas General Staff Academy in 1910, reaching the rank of colonel in the  Caucasus Grenadiers division in September 1917 during World War I. Also in 1917, unusually for an officer of his rank, he supported the  Russian Revolution, and in May 1918 joined the Red Army.

Shaposhnikov was one of the few Red Army commanders with formal pre-revolutionary military training, and in 1921 he became 1st Deputy Chief of Staff of the Army's  General Staff, where he served until 1925. He was appointed commander of the Leningrad Military District in 1925 and then of the Moscow Military District in 1927. From 1928 to 1931 he served as  Chief of the Staff of the Red Army, replacing Mikhail Tukhachevsky, with whom he had a strained relationship. He was then demoted to command of the Volga Military District from April 1931 to 1932 as a result of slanderous accusations (made by an arrested staff-officer) of belonging to a clandestine organization. In 1932 he was appointed commandant of the Red Army's Frunze Military Academy, then in 1935 he returned to the command of the Leningrad region. In 1937 he was appointed as Chief of the General Staff, in succession to Alexander Ilyich Yegorov, a victim of a Case of Trotskyist Anti-Soviet Military Organization secret trial during Joseph Stalin's Great Purge of the Red Army. In May 1940 he was appointed a Marshal of the Soviet Union.

Despite his background as a Tsarist officer, Shaposhnikov won the respect and trust of Stalin. Due to his status as a professional officer, he did not join the  Communist Party until 1939. This may have helped him avoid Stalin's suspicions. The price he paid for his survival during the purges was collaboration in the destruction of Tukhachevsky and of many other colleagues. Stalin showed his admiration for the officer by always keeping a copy of Shaposhnikov's most important work, Mozg Armii (Мозг армии, "The Brain of the Army") (1929), on his desk. Shaposhnikov was one of the few men whom Stalin  addressed by his Christian name and patronymic. Mozg Armii has remained on the curriculum of the General Staff Academy since its publication in 1929. 

Fortunately for the Soviet Union, Shaposhnikov had a fine military mind and high administrative skills. He combined these talents with his position in Stalin's confidence to rebuild the Red Army's leadership cadres after the purges. He obtained the release from the Gulag of 4,000 officers deemed necessary for this operation. In 1939 Stalin accepted Shaposhnikov's plan for a rapid buildup of the Red Army's strength. Although the planned changes remained incomplete at the time of the Axis invasion of June 1941, they had advanced sufficiently to save the Soviet Union from complete disaster.

Shaposhnikov planned the 1939 Soviet invasion of Finland, but was much less optimistic about its duration than Stalin and the campaign's commander Kliment Voroshilov. The resultant Winter War (1939–1940) did not deliver the immediate success the Soviet side had hoped for, and Shaposhnikov resigned as Chief of the General Staff in August 1940, due to ill-health and to disagreements with Stalin about the conduct of that campaign. Following the  Axis invasion of the Soviet Union on 22 June 1941, he was reinstated (29 July 1941) as Chief of the General Staff to succeed Georgy Zhukov, and also became  Deputy People's Commissar for Defence, the post he held until his career was cut short by ill-health in 1943. He resigned again as Chief of the General Staff due to ill-health on 10 May 1942. He held the position of commandant of the  Voroshilov Military Academy until his death in 1945. Shaposhnikov had groomed his successor as Chief of Staff, Aleksandr Vasilevsky, and remained an influential and respected advisor to Stalin until his death in 1945 at the age 62. His ashes were buried in the Kremlin Wall Necropolis.

Honours and awards

 Order of St. Anna, 4th class (26 October 1914), 3rd class with Swords and Bow (1915), 2nd class with Swords (1 November 1916)
 Order of St. Vladimir, 4th class with Swords and Bow (2 November 1914)
 Order of Saint Stanislaus, 3rd class with Swords and Bow (22 July 1916)

 Three Orders of Lenin (31 December 1939, 3 October 1942, 21 February 1945)
 Order of the Red Banner, twice (14 October 1921, 3 November 1944)
 Order of Suvorov, 1st class (22 February 1944)
 Order of the Red Star, twice (15 January 1934, 22 February 1938)
 Jubilee Medal "XX Years of the Workers' and Peasants' Red Army" (22 February 1938)
 Medal "For the Defence of Moscow" (1 May 1944)

See also
 Russian destroyer Marshal Shaposhnikov (BPK 543)

References

Citations

Bibliography

External links
 

1882 births
1945 deaths
People from Zlatoust
People from Zlatoustovsky Uyezd
Russian nobility
Central Committee of the Communist Party of the Soviet Union candidate members
Central Executive Committee of the Soviet Union members
First convocation members of the Soviet of the Union
Marshals of the Soviet Union
Imperial Russian Army officers
Russian military writers
Frunze Military Academy alumni
Commandants of the Frunze Military Academy
Russian military personnel of World War I
Soviet military personnel of World War II
Recipients of the Order of St. Vladimir, 4th class
Recipients of the Order of St. Anna, 2nd class
Recipients of the Order of Lenin
Recipients of the Order of the Red Banner
Recipients of the Order of Suvorov, 1st class
Burials at the Kremlin Wall Necropolis
Residents of the Benois House